Garden City South is a hamlet and census-designated place (CDP) in the Town of Hempstead in Nassau County, on Long Island, in New York, United States. The population was 4,119 at the 2020 census.

History 
Garden City South's name reflects upon its geographic location south of the Village of Garden City.

Geography

Demographics

As of the census of 2020, there were 4,119 people and 1,312 households residing in the CDP. The median household income was $146,346 and those with a Bachelor's Degree or Higher at 49.1% and an employment Rate of 62.4%.

Race and ethnicity population reported in the 2020 census are as follows: White alone: 3260, Black or African descent: 46, American Indian and Alaska Native alone: 8, Asian alone: 348, and some other race alone: 181.

There were 1,312 households, out of which 20.8% had children under the age of 18 living with them, 64.1% were married couples living together, 10.3% had a female householder with no husband present, and 22.2% were non-families. 18.0% of all households were made up of individuals, and 11.2% had someone living alone who was 65 years of age or older. The average household size was 2.84 and the average family size was 3.24.

In the CDP, the population was spread out, with 22.3% under the age of 18, 6.7% from 18 to 24, 29.2% from 25 to 44, 22.8% from 45 to 64, and 19.1% who were 65 years of age or older. The median age was 40 years. For every 100 females, there were 90.3 males. For every 100 females age 18 and over, there were 87.7 males.

See also

 List of census-designated places in New York

References

External links

Hempstead, New York
Census-designated places in New York (state)
Hamlets in New York (state)
Census-designated places in Nassau County, New York
Hamlets in Nassau County, New York